Seminole Hard Rock Hotel and Casino may refer to:
 Seminole Hard Rock Hotel & Casino Hollywood, located near Miami, Florida
 Seminole Hard Rock Hotel and Casino Tampa, located in Tampa, Florida
 Hard Rock Cafe, a chain of theme restaurants and other interests owned by the Seminole Tribe of Florida